This is a list of museums in Tajikistan.

Museums in Tajikistan 

Gurminj Museum of Musical Instruments
Historical Museum of Sughd
Tajikistan National Museum
Panjakent Museum
Tajikistan National Museum of Antiquities in Dushanbe

See also 

 List of museums

External links 	

Museums
 
Museums
Tajikistan
Museums
Tajikistan